This page lists Japan-related articles with romanized titles beginning with the letter L. For names of people, please list by surname (i.e., "Tarō Yamada" should be listed under "Y", not "T"). Please also ignore particles (e.g. "a", "an", "the") when listing articles (i.e., "A City with No People" should be listed under "City").

L
L'Arc-en-Ciel

La
La Blue Girl
La Pérouse Strait
Labor unions in Japan
Lacquerware
Lady Ise
Lady Saigō
Lady Tsukiyama
Lafcadio Hearn
Lake Biwa
Lake Kizaki
Lake Mashū
Lake Towada
Lakitu
Lan Di
Language minority students in Japanese classrooms
Lansing–Ishii Agreement
The Last Blade
The Last Samurai
Late Tokugawa shogunate
Lavos

Le
Legend of the Galactic Heroes
Legend of the Overfiend
The Legend of Zelda
The Legend of Zelda: A Link to the Past
The Legend of Zelda: Collector's Edition
The Legend of Zelda: Four Swords Plus
The Legend of Zelda: Link's Awakening
The Legend of Zelda: Majora's Mask
The Legend of Zelda: Ocarina of Time
The Legend of Zelda: Ocarina of Time Master Quest
The Legend of Zelda: Oracle of Ages
The Legend of Zelda: Oracle of Seasons
The Legend of Zelda: Tetra's Trackers
The Legend of Zelda: The Wind Waker
Leiji Matsumoto
Lemon (anime)
Léon Roches
Lexus

Lg
LGBT rights in Japan (Gay rights)

Lh
LHA (file format)
Lhasa (computing)

Li
Liancourt Rocks
Liberal Democratic Party (Japan)
Liberal Party of Japan (1881)
Liberal Party (Japan, 1945)
Liberal Party (Japan, 1998)
The Life of Oharu
Gary Lineker
Link (The Legend of Zelda)
List of Japanese actors
List of Japanese actresses
List of airports in Japan
List of battleships of Japan
List of cities and districts of Okinawa Prefecture
List of cities in Hokkaidō
List of cities in Japan
List of Dragon Ball films
List of Emperors of Japan
List of English words of Japanese origin
List of Final Fantasy characters
List of Final Fantasy locations
List of football clubs in Japan
List of games by Konami
List of hospitals in Japan
List of islands of Japan
List of Japanese birds
List of Japanese birds: non-passerines
List of Japanese birds: passerines
List of Japanese board games
List of Japanese cities by population
List of Japanese companies
List of Japanese cooking utensils
List of Japanese film directors
Lists of Japanese governors-general
List of Japanese prefectures ranked by area
List of Japanese prefectures by population
List of museums in Japan
List of prime ministers of Japan

Li (cont'd)
List of Japan-related topics
List of Japanese rock bands
List of Japanese people
List of Japanese writers
List of legendary creatures from Japan
List of manga
List of military aircraft of Japan
List of national parks of Japan
List of Olympus products
List of political parties in Japan
List of railway companies in Japan
List of samurai
List of schools in Japan
List of ships of the Japanese Navy
List of supernatural beings in Dragon Ball
List of universities in Japan
List of Westerners who visited Japan before 1868
List of yokozuna
Little Boy
Live under the sky

Lj
LJN

Lo
Local Autonomy Law
Local train
Loli-con
Lolita fashion
Lone Wolf and Cub
The long love letter
Loose socks
Loppi (ticketing system)
Lotus Sutra
Loudness
Love Hina
Love Hina Again
Love Hina main characters
Love Hina media information
Love Hina minor characters
Love hotel
Love Letter

Lu
Lu Xun
Lucky Records
Luffy D. Monkey
Luigi
Luigi's Mansion
Lugia
Luís Fróis
Luna (Sailor Moon)
Lupin the 3rd

Ly
Lyndis
Lynn Minmay

L